The Neumünster Collegiate church (German: Kollegiatstift Neumünster) is a collegiate church in Würzburg, Germany. The church dates back to 1065. 

In 1060 Adalbero of Würzburg built a church with a nave and aisles and two choirs in Romanesque style. From 1180 to 1250 the church was renovated and its eastern section was expanded. The Romanesque west choir was demolished, and from 1711 to 1716 Josef Greising built the west façade in Baroque style. From 1725 the interior was redesigned in the baroque style by the brothers Johann Baptist Zimmermann and Dominikus Zimmermann.

The church was damaged during the Bombing of Würzburg in World War II. From 1945 to 1952 the interior was restored.

References

Collegiate churches in Germany
Romanesque architecture in Germany